Mount Terra Nova is a snow-covered inactive volcanic mountain, between Mount Erebus and Mount Terror on Ross Island. It was first mapped by the Discovery expedition in 1901–04, and named for Terra Nova, the relief ship for this expedition and the British Antarctic Expedition, 1910–13.

Terra Nova Saddle is one of three prominent snow saddles on Ross Island, this one at   between Mount Erebus and Mount Terra Nova.

Terra Nova Glacier is a glacier about 5 nautical miles (9 km) long in north–central Ross Island. It flows north from the saddle between Mount Erebus and Mount Terra Nova into Lewis Bay. It is so named for its proximity to Mount Terra Nova.

See also
List of volcanoes in Antarctica

References

Mountains of Ross Island